Release Date is the 12th studio album by the Finnish avant-garde progressive metal band Waltari.

The track "Spokebone" is a collaboration between Waltari, Tomi Joutsen of Amorphis, and the Finnish folk group Värttinä.

Track listing

 "Get Stamped" - 4:44
 "Big Sleep" - 3:55
 "Let's Puke Together" - 4:06
 "Cityshamaani - Night Flight" - 7:46
 "Cityshamaani - Good Morning" - 3:24
 "Cityshamaani - Colgate County Showdown" - 4:42
 "Cityshamaani - The Incarnation Party" - 7:17
 "Cityshamaani - Sympathy" - 13:00
 "Hype" - 3:29
 "THD" 1:52
 "Sex in the Biergarten" - 4:13
 "Wish I Could Heal" - 7:37
 "Spokebone" - 4:45

Credits
Kärtsy Hatakka - Vocals, bass, programming
Sami Yli-Sirniö - Guitar
Jari Lehtinen - Guitar
Janne Immonen - Keyboards
Ville Vehviläinen - Drums

Guests
Värttinä
Tomi Joutsen (Amorphis) - Vocals
Ville Tuomi (Sub-Urban Tribe) - Vocals
Jan Rechberger (Amorphis) - Programming
Olli Rantala - Vocals, slap bass
Vesa Ania - Horn
Vaasa Lesbian Choir ´06

Charts

References

External links
Encyclopaedia Metallum page

Waltari albums
2007 albums